Leucostoma edentatum is a North American species of fly in the family Tachinidae.

Distribution
Israel.

References

Phasiinae
Diptera of Asia
Insects described in 1978